Craig Alexander (born 22 June 1973) is an Australian triathlete who is the 2008, 2009 & 2011 Ironman Triathlon World Champion. He was the course record holder for the Ironman World Championship. He is also the winner of the Ironman 70.3 World Championship in 2006 and 2011.

Triathlon career

Early career

In December 1993, Alexander raced in his first triathlon at Kurnell in Southern Sydney.

Alexander split his time between Olympic Distance racing and Half Iron distance from 2002 to 2005, winning a total of 20 races in his first 4 years as a professional triathlete.

Ironman racing

In 2006, Alexander's first major win was at the Ironman 70.3 World Championships in Clearwater, Florida.  The win automatically qualified him for the Ironman World Championships in Kailua-Kona, Hawaii in 2007. In 2007 he made the jump to Ironman racing with his debut at Ironman Hawaii.

On 23 March 2014, following his race at the Ironman Triathlon Asia Pacific Championships, Alexander officially announced his retirement from Ironman distance racing.

Coaching career

On 7 February 2014, Alexander announced his entry into triathlon coaching, and his coaching business, Sansego. Along with three other triathlon coaches he hosted a three-day advanced triathlon course in Wollongong.

Personal life
Alexander attended Ashfield Boys High School and went on to study Anatomy and Physiology at university.

References

External links 
 

1973 births
Australian male triathletes
Ironman world champions
Living people
People educated at Ashfield Boys' High School
20th-century Australian people
21st-century Australian people
Sportsmen from New South Wales